The Bloomfields is a Filipino band heavily influenced by 1960s music and is currently composed of Rocky Collado, Lakan Hila, Louie Poco, and Nathan Abella. They first gained prominence in their alma mater La Salle Greenhills in 2002 and went mainstream in 2005. The band is famous for their hit songs Wala Nang Iba and their rendition of Ale and Babaero. The band is also known for all of its members adept at doing vocals.

Founding members and brothers Jayjay Lozano and Pepe Lozano left the band some time in 2009 due to creative differences and formed their own bands called The Bloom Brothers and The Band of Brothers (later shortened to TBB). The Bloomfields and the Lozanos have since then been in good terms two years after the Lozanos departed. Other notable member was Dino Pascual who left the band in 2021 to pursue personal endeavors.

Advocacy
The Bloomfields supports Senyas Kamay, a support organization for the hearing impaired.

Members
 Rocky Collado - vocals, drums, percussion 
 Lakan Hila - vocals, keyboards ; lead guitar 
 Louie Poco - vocals, bass guitar 
 Nathan Abella - vocals, rhythm guitar

Former members
 Jayjay Lozano - vocals, rhythm guitar, percussion, aerophones 
 Pepe Lozano - vocals, lead guitar 
 Dino Pascual - vocals, rhythm guitar, keyboards, aerophones

Albums
A Drop Into The Blue (2019) – Fourth Album, Second All-Original
Hit The Ground Running (2011) – Third Album, First All-Original
Pasko Natin 'To (2008) – Second Album (Christmas Album)
The Bloomfields (2007) - First Album, with (five) Originals

Awards and nominations

References

External links

The Bloomfields on AllMusic

Filipino rock music groups
Musical groups from Metro Manila
Musical groups established in 2002
2002 establishments in the Philippines
Filipino pop music groups
Musical quartets